Cleopatra Mary Palmer  (née Sylvestre; born 19 April 1945), known professionally as Cleo Sylvestre, is an English actress in film, stage and television. She was the first black woman ever to play a leading role at the National Theatre in London.

Life and career
She was brought up in Euston, north London by her mother, Laureen Sylvestre (née Goodare), a cabaret artist at the Shim Sham Club in Wardour Street, who was born in Yorkshire in 1911. Sylvestre was educated at Camden School for Girls and also attended the Italia Conti Academy of Theatre Arts. In 1964 she released a single, "To Know Him Is to Love Him", under the name "Cleo", produced by Andrew Loog Oldham and backed by The Rolling Stones. After Brian Jones left the Rolling Stones in 1969, she agreed to rehearse with his new band but abandoned music to concentrate on her theatre and television work.

Her West End debut was at Wyndham's Theatre in Wise Child (1967) by Simon Gray, in which she starred alongside Sir Alec Guinness and was nominated most promising new actress. She was the first black actress in a leading role at the National Theatre in The National Health (1969) by Peter Nichols. She did several seasons with the Young Vic Company, including Molière's Les Fourberies de Scapin on Broadway and a tour of Mexico. She has subsequently worked in many regional theatres, including the Theatre Royal, Lincoln, the Theatre Royal, Brighton, the Theatre Royal, York, the Derby Playhouse and the Belgrade Theatre, Coventry. On the fringe she played Phaedre on the Edinburgh Fringe in 2007 and Rosa Parks, Josephine Baker and Wangari Maathai in Alison Mead's A Century of Women at Leicester Square Theatre (2011). She appeared with Antony Sher in his play ID (2003) at the Almeida Theatre, toured with English Touring Theatre in Far from the Madding Crowd (2008) and with Northern Broadsides in its 2010 production of Medea. Children's theatre work includes seasons at the Unicorn Theatre and the London Bubble Theatre Company.

Her television appearances include: Ken Loach's Up the Junction (1965), Cathy Come Home (1966) and Poor Cow (1967), as well as appearances in the original Till Death Us Do Part, Z-Cars, Callan, Doctors, New Tricks, The Armando Iannucci Shows, Chambers, The Bill, Who Do You Do and A Bird in the Hand, a Tube Tales episode directed by Jude Law. After a brief appearance as a factory worker in soap opera Coronation Street in 1966, she became the first ever regular black British female character on British TV, in the original series of Crossroads, playing Meg Richardson's adopted daughter Melanie from 1970 to 1972. She was also a regular in Grange Hill, Happy Families and presented Play School and Merry-Go-Round. In 2020 she played Anne Chapman in All Creatures Great and Small.

Her film credits include Till Death Us Do Part (1969), The Smashing Bird I Used to Know (1969), Trog (1970), My Lover My Son (1970), The Alf Garnett Saga (1972), Sammy and Rosie Get Laid (1987), The Love Child (1988), The Punk and the Princess (2003), Kidulthood (2006) and Paddington (2014), and she has made several shorts with director Isaac Julien, including The Attendant (1992) and Vagabondia (2000), which was shortlisted for that year's Turner Prize.

For twenty years until 2016 she was  joint Artistic Director of the award winning Rosemary Branch Theatre. She was also an Ambassador for the Mary Seacole Memorial Statue Appeal (MSMA).In April 2019 she was awarded Screen Nation's Trailblazer Award.

Her acclaimed one-woman show The Marvellous Adventure of Mary Seacole, has been performed at numerous venues, including the House of Lords, the National Portrait Gallery, the Mercury Theatre, Colchester, the Mill Studio at the Yvonne Arnaud Theatre, Guildford and The Edinburgh Festival.

She has also reviewed for The Listener magazine and the Times Educational Supplement and contributed a chapter to Theatre in a Cool Climate (Amber Lane Press, 1999). A former council member of Equity, the British actors' union, she has been on the board of the Young Vic, Hoxton Hall, Quicksilver Theatre for Children and the Free Form Arts Trust, as well as a judge for the Race in the Media Awards (RIMA) and Croydon Warehouse Theatre's International Playwriting Competition.

She was the inspiration for the character of Honey in the Gaspard the Fox series of children's books by Zeb Soanes, illustrated by James Mayhew, first appearing in Gaspard: Best in Show (Graffeg, 2019). Writing in 2020, Soanes said, 'I can’t remember when I realised that my friend Cleo was exactly the character I was looking for but it was a ‘lightbulb’ moment. Cleo has been a trailblazer throughout her career [...] and it’s a real pleasure to be able to pay tribute to her.'

Sylvestre was appointed Member of the Order of the British Empire (MBE) in the 2023 New Year Honours for services to drama and charity.

Personal life

Her godparents were composer Constant Lambert, Labour peer Tom Driberg and Daria Hambourg (daughter of the pianist Mark Hambourg). Sylvestre married Ian Palmer in 1977 (d. 1995) and they had three children: Zoë Palmer (creator of children's opera series Musical Rumpus, a writer  and  TV presenter for Globetrekker and Fierce Earth), Lucy and Rupert.

Selected bibliography

Theatre 
 The Marvellous Adventures of Mary Seacole (2021) /  The Marvellous Adventures of Mary Seacole , Aurora Metro Books, 2021)

References

External links

Cleo Sylvestre interview at crossroadsnetwork
Theatre Archive Project interview with Cleo Sylvestre

1945 births
Living people
English television actresses
English stage actresses
English film actresses
People educated at Camden School for Girls
Members of the Order of the British Empire